The 1st Canadian Infantry Battalion was a battalion of the Canadian Expeditionary Force that saw service in the First World War.

History 
The battalion was created on 2 September 1914 with recruits from "Military District 1" which was Western Ontario. The battalion set off for England on board the Laurentic berthed in Quebec. They arrived in England on 14 October 1914 with a strength of 45 officers and 1121 men. The battalion became part of the 1st Canadian Division, 1st Canadian Infantry Brigade where it saw action at Ypres and along the Western Front.

The battalion returned to Canada on 21 April 1919, was demobilized on 24 April 1919, and disbanded soon after.

Perpetuation 
The 1st Canadian Infantry Battalion was initially perpetuated by The Canadian Fusiliers (City of London Regiment), and is currently perpetuated by The Royal Canadian Regiment.

Battle Honours

The Great War 

 Ypres 1915, 17
 Gravenstafel
 St. Julien
 Festubert, 1915
 Mount Sorrel
 Somme 1916
 Pozieres
 Flers-Courcelette
 Ancre Heights
 Arras 1917-1918
 Vimy 1917
 Arleux
 Scarpe 1917, 1918
 Hill 70
 Passchendaele
 Amiens
 Drocourt –Queant
 Hindenburg Line
 Canal du Nord
 Pursuit to Mons
 France and Flanders 1915-1918.

Notable Members 
Lieutenant Frederick William Campbell was awarded the Victoria Cross for his heroism in action 15 June 1915 at Givenchy, France; he died of wounds four days later.

See also 

 List of infantry battalions in the Canadian Expeditionary Force

References

External links
Honour Roll

001
Military units and formations of Ontario
Military units and formations disestablished in 1918